100 Humans is a 2020 streaming television series. The premise revolves around 100 people who go through different experiments on the theme of behavior. It is based on the Dutch TV program Het Instituut, broadcast in 2016 and 2017.

Cast 
 Alie Ward (host)
 Zainab Johnson (host)
 Sammy Obeid (host)
 Komalpreet Batth
 Haley Bockrath
 Dylan George
 Alley Kerr
 Lakrishi Kindred
 Jessica-Lee Korkes
 Charlotte Laws
 Aaron Louie
 Aneiszka Sea
 Tyanta Snow
 Alan Squats
 Alfredo Tavares
 Ryan Zamo
 Khyran Shank
 David Eby
 Avalon Warren
 Erik Anthony Russo
 Belinda Cai
 Janelle Hopkins

Release 
100 Humans was released on March 13, 2020, on Netflix.

Episodes

Trivia
All episodes and topics are taken from the Dutch original series Het Instituut. This also holds for the last episodes where allegedly several of the 100 humans had come up with their own question, but these were actually also included in the earlier Dutch shows.

References

External links
 
 

2020 American television series debuts
Netflix original documentary television series
English-language Netflix original programming
American non-fiction television series
Television series by Warner Bros. Television Studios